The 2022 Qatari Stars Cup is the twelfth edition of Qatari Stars Cup.

The tournament features 12 teams divided into 2 groups.

Round One Groups

Standings

Group A

Results

Group B

Results

Knockout round

Semi-finals

Final

References

Qatari Stars Cup
Qatari Stars Cup
Qatari Stars Cup